"Keep Holding On" is a power ballad by Canadian singer-songwriter Avril Lavigne, appearing as the last track on Lavigne's third studio album, The Best Damn Thing (2007), which was released on April 17, 2007. Lavigne has described the rest of the album as being upbeat and heavy in comparison to "Keep Holding On". Originally, an alternate version was to be included, but the original version made it instead.

Written by Lavigne and Lukasz "Dr. Luke" Gottwald and produced by the latter, the song premiered on radio stations across North America in November 2006, receiving positive reviews from critics. It was used as the musical theme for the 2006 film Eragon, also appearing in the film's ending credits, and was the first single released from the film's soundtrack. "Keep Holding On" was one of the songs short-listed for the "Best Original Song" category at the 79th Academy Awards, but it was not among the final nominees. The song was also ranked on the iTunes Australia top 500 at 403.

Background and composition

"Keep Holding On" was written by Lavigne and produced by co-writer Lukasz "Dr. Luke" Gottwald. The strings were arranged and conducted by Leon Pendarvis, long time SNL associate with Dr. Luke. The song was recorded at Henson Recording Studios (Los Angeles) in 2006. According to the sheetmusic published at musicnotes.com by Universal Music Publishing Group, the song is composed in the key of G major and is set in time signature of 6/8 time with a tempo of 56 beats per minute. Lavigne vocal range spans from F#3 to D5.

Reception

Commercial
"Keep Holding On" reached number two for four weeks on the Canadian BDS Airplay Chart, being kept off the top spot by Nelly Furtado's "Say It Right". It became her highest-peaking airplay single there since "Complicated" which peaked at number one for one week in 2002. It was peaked on the top twenty at number fourteen on the Canadian Hot 100, were it spent twenty weeks on the chart. In the United States, "Keep Holding On" was peaked within the top twenty on the US Billboard Hot 100 chart, peaking at seventeen, charting below Lavigne's "Girlfriend" that was number one on the Hot 100 on that week. The song spent 21 weeks on the US Billboard Hot 100. It was peaked on the top ten on the Hot Adult Top 40 Tracks format chart. This feat is particularly impressive considering no official music video was made to promote it. 

It was not released in most of Europe, although it got to 9 in Slovakia, 27 in the Czech Republic and 32 in Latvia. The single was one of the first to be issued as a digital-only release in Australia, where it charted at #5 on the Top 40 Digital Tracks chart. It was also certified Gold by the RIAA on February 22, 2007 and Platinum on January 31, 2008.
As of September 2015, "Keep Holding On" had sold 1.6 million digital copies in the USA.

Critical
Despite the film being panned by critics, the song has been well received by music critics, with Billboard describing it as a "gorgeous song" in which Lavigne seems to be "set to remain for the long term". Darryl Sterdan of JAM! described the song as "A strummed guitar, lush strings and a soaring vocal about love and loyalty". He went on to compare it to "a sweeping Alanis-like ballad". Despite this, Sterdan advises the reader to skip the track. Sal Cinquemani of Slant magazine described the song as "sullen". Entertainment Weekly was negative: "And: I will only have like 3 slow songs on the record. Yay!! Yay, indeed, given how little heart she's invested in that trio of limpid ballads, including Keep Holding On, a.k.a. the love theme from Eragon." Stylus described ""Keep Holding On" ends the album for the same reason graduation ends high school: because after all that, Hallmark means something." Dave Donnely praised the picking: "'Keep Holding On' is a stay-over from the Lord of the Eragons soundtrack, a pop ballad which demonstrates his gift for spotting and isolating great melodies." PopMatters stated that this song tries to match "I'm with You" but it fails.

In an AOL Radio listener's poll, "Keep Holding On" was voted Lavigne's fifth best song.

Accolades

Notable cover versions
In April 2015, The Voice Kids Philippines Season 1 runner-up Darren Espanto sung his rendition of the song on ABS-CBN noontime show, It's Showtime.

Track listings and formats
Digital download
"Keep Holding On"  – 3:59

Credits and personnel
Credits and personnel are adapted from the "Keep Holding On" CD single liner notes.
 Avril Lavigne – writer, vocals
 Lukasz Gottwald – writer, producer, piano, bass, guitars
 Chris Lord-Alge – mixing
 Stephen Marcussen – mastering
 Seth Waldmann – recording
 Keith Gretlein – recording
 Mike Caffrey – recording
 Tom Syrowski – recording
 Tatiana Gottwald – recording
 Steve Churchyard – recording
 Billy Griggs – recording
 Steven Wolf – drums, percussion
 Leon Pendarvis – strings
 Matt Beckley – additional production

Charts

Weekly charts

Year-end charts

Certifications

Release history

References

2000s ballads
2006 singles
Avril Lavigne songs
Inheritance Cycle
Pop ballads
RCA Records singles
Song recordings produced by Dr. Luke
Songs written by Avril Lavigne
Songs written by Dr. Luke
Songs written for films
Sony BMG singles

lt:The Best Damn Thing#Keep Holding On